Francis William Grey (1860–1939) was a British-born Canadian writer and academic. He was most noted for his 1899 novel The Curé of St. Philippe, which was republished by McClelland and Stewart's New Canadian Library series in 1970.

Born and educated in England, Grey moved to Canada in adulthood and worked as a professor of English at the University of Ottawa, and later for the National Archives of Canada. Married to a French Canadian woman, he became knowledgeable about French Canadian culture; The Curé of St. Philippe has often been regarded by critics as a relatively weak novel in terms of storytelling, yet a strong and highly detailed portrait of French Canadian social and cultural organization in its era through its depiction of a small town in the process of building and launching its own new Roman Catholic church. It was Grey's only novel, although he published academic non-fiction, poetry and theatrical plays.

References

1860 births
1939 deaths
19th-century British dramatists and playwrights
19th-century British non-fiction writers
19th-century British novelists
19th-century British poets
19th-century British male writers
19th-century Canadian dramatists and playwrights
19th-century Canadian non-fiction writers
19th-century Canadian novelists
19th-century Canadian poets
19th-century Canadian male writers
20th-century British dramatists and playwrights
20th-century British non-fiction writers
20th-century British poets
20th-century British male writers
20th-century Canadian dramatists and playwrights
20th-century Canadian non-fiction writers
20th-century Canadian poets
20th-century Canadian male writers
British male dramatists and playwrights
British male non-fiction writers
British male novelists
British male poets
British emigrants to Canada
Canadian male dramatists and playwrights
Canadian male non-fiction writers
Canadian male novelists
Canadian male poets
Academic staff of the University of Ottawa
Canadian civil servants